Kalyanam may refer to:
 Kalyanam (2009 TV series), a 2009 Indian Tamil-language soap opera
 Kalyanam (2016 TV series), a Singapore Tamil soap opera
 Kalyanam (season 2), 2017 season of the Tamil soap opera
 Kalyanam (Non-governmental organization)
 Kalyanam (film), a 2018 Malayalam romantic-comedy film

See also